Hrafnsmál ("raven song") is a fragmentary skaldic poem generally accepted as being written by the 9th-century Norwegian skald Þorbjörn Hornklofi. Hrafnsmál largely consists of a conversation between an unnamed valkyrie and a raven; the two discuss the life and martial deeds of Harald Fairhair. Due to this, the poem is sometimes referred to as Haraldskvæði . The meter of the poem is dominantly Málaháttr, while smaller portions are in Ljóðaháttr and Fornyrðislag. Through dating of the parts as well as the meter is consistent, they may be separate compositions but scholarly consensus is indecisive. The poem is usually described as a praise poem, but bears more resemblance in style to the Eddic poems. In style, it so much resembles Atlakviða (one of the oldest Eddic poems) that it has been suggested they were both composed by Hornklofi. Stanzas from the poem were reworked into a song by Einar Selvik for the game Assassin's Creed Valhalla.

Editions and translations
 Borrow, George (Trans.) (1862). Once A Week: An Illustrated Miscellany of Literature, Art, Science &Popular Information. Vol. VII. June to December, 1862. London: Bradbury & Evans, 11, Bouverie Street. Entitled Harald Harfagr. Features an illustration by Anthony Frederick Augustus Sandys.
 Kershaw, Nora (1922). Anglo-Saxon and Norse Poems. Cambridge at the University Press.
 Hollander, Lee Milton (1980). Old Norse Poems: The Most Important Nonskaldic Verse Not Included in the Poetic Edda. Forgotten Books.

See also
Huginn and Muninn, the ravens of the god Odin
Valravn, a supernatural "raven of the slain" appearing in 19th century Danish folk songs

Notes

References

 Hollander, Lee Milton (1980). Old Norse Poems: The Most Important Nonskaldic Verse Not Included in the Poetic Edda. Forgotten Books. 
 Orchard, Andy (1997). Dictionary of Norse Myth and Legend. Cassell.

External links
 Hrafnsmál from heimskringla.no

Skaldic poems
Sources of Norse mythology
Cultural depictions of Harald Fairhair